Slezský FC Opava is a professional football club based in Opava, Czech Republic. The club plays in the Czech National Football League, the second of Czech football after being relegated from the Czech First League at the end of the 2020–21 season.

History
The club was in the Czech First League at the top tier of Czech football from 1995 to 2000, getting relegated in 2000 but returning to the top flight the following season in 2001. After another relegation they returned again in 2003 and had a two-year spell in the top division, but internal issues led to a slow decline of the club and relegation to the regional division. The club celebrated a return to the Second Division in 2011, but after just two seasons, they were relegated back to the Moravian–Silesian Football League (MSFL) in 2013. The club won promotion back into the second level of football in their first season in the MSFL. They won the Czech National Football League in 2018, securing promotion to the top flight. However they were relegated to the National League again in 2021.

Historical names
 1907–09 – Troppauer Fussballverein
 1909–39 – Deutscher Sportverein Troppau
 1939–45 – NS Turngemeinde Troppau
 1945–48 – SK Slezan Opava
 1948–50 – Sokol Slezan Opava
 1950–53 – ZSJ SPJP Opava
 1953–58 – TJ Baník Opava
 1958–90 – TJ Ostroj Opava
 1990–94 – FK Ostroj Opava
 1994–98 – FC Kaučuk Opava
 Since 1998 – SFC Opava

Fans and rivalries
The club has a group of fanatical fans called Opaváci  who frequently produce tifos and displays, as well as travel to away games. They have a friendship with fellow Silesian team Śląsk Wrocław and have derby rivalries with FC Baník Ostrava and FC Hlučín, with the matches between them known as the Silesian Derby.

Players

Current squad
.

Out on loan

Notable former players

Player records in the Czech First League
.

Most appearances

Most goals

Most clean sheets

Managers

 Vlastimil Bělík (1945–?)
 Jan Novák (late 1940s)
 Václav Smetánka (late 1940s)
 Karel Novák (1957)
 Milan Pouba (1958 – April 1961)
 Josef Černohorský (April 1961 – September 1961)
 Milan Pouba (September 1961 – 1963), second term
 Karel Čapek (1963–1964)
 Milan Pouba (1964–1965)
 Karel Čapek (1965 – September 1966)
 Jan Balnar (September 1966 – 1967)
 Milan Pouba (1967 – August 1968)
 Karel Novák (September 1968 – 1970)
 Anton Krásnohorský (1970)
 Evžen Hadamczik (1970–1978)
 Karel Větrovec (1978)
 Květoslav Stříž (1978)
 Milan Pouba (1978–1979)
 Petr Hudec (1979–1980)
 Milan Pouba (1980–1981)
 Alois Sommer (1981–1990)
 Petr Žemlík (1990–1992)
 Petr Ondrášek (1992)
 Oldřich Sedláček (1992 – April 1993)
 Alois Sommer (1993)
 Jaroslav Pindor (1993)
 Jaroslav Gürtler (1993–1994)
 Petr Žemlík (1994–1997)
 Jiří Nejedlý (1997–1998)
 Petr Žemlík (1998)
 Jiří Bartl (1998–2000)
 Petr Uličný (2000)
 Bohuš Keler (2000–01)
 Miroslav Mentel (2001–02)
 Karel Jarůšek (2002–03)
 Pavel Hapal (2003–04)
 Vlastimil Palička (2004–05)
 Radoslav Látal (2008–09)
 Josef Mazura (2010–12)
 David Vavruška (2012–13)
 Jan Baránek (2013–16)
 Roman Skuhravý (2016–2018)
 Ivan Kopecký (2018–2019)
 Josef Dvorník (2019)
 Jiří Balcárek (2019–2020)
 Radoslav Kováč (2020–2021)
 Roman West (2021–2022)
 Peter Hlinka (2023–present)

Honours
Czech 2. liga (second tier)
 Runner-up 1994–95, 2000–01, 2002–03
Moravian–Silesian Football League (third tier)
 Champions 2010–11, 2013–14
Krajský přebor Moravskoslezského kraje (fifth tier)
 Champions 2005–06
Czech Cup:
 Runner-up 2016–17

Club records

Czech First League records
Best position: 6th (1995–96)
Worst position: 18th (2020–21)
Biggest home win: Opava 5–0 Příbram (2018–19)
Biggest away win: Slovácko 0–2 Opava (2018–19)
Biggest home defeat: Opava 0–6 Slavia Prague (2020–21)
Biggest away defeat: Jablonec 5–0 Opava (2001–02), Mladá Boleslav 6–1 Opava (2018–19)

References

External links
 

 
Football clubs in the Czech Republic
Association football clubs established in 1907
Czech First League clubs
1907 establishments in Austria-Hungary